Per-Arne Berglund (20 January 1927 – 6 January 2002) was a Swedish javelin thrower who won a silver medal at the 1950 European Athletics Championships. He competed at the 1948 and 1952 Summer Olympics and finished in tenth place each time. Berglund was ranked first in the world in 1949. He won the Swedish national title in 1950–52 and 1955–57.

References

1927 births
2002 deaths
Swedish male javelin throwers
Olympic athletes of Sweden
Athletes (track and field) at the 1948 Summer Olympics
Athletes (track and field) at the 1952 Summer Olympics
European Athletics Championships medalists
Sportspeople from Örebro